John Paul II Institute (Pontifical John Paul II Institute for Studies on Marriage and Family) is a center at  the Catholic University of America 

John Paul II Institute may also refer to:

 John Paul II Institute of Divine Mercy, Poland
 John Paul II Medical Research Institute, Iowa City, Iowa
 John Paul II Pontifical Theological Institute for Marriage and Family Sciences, Rome, Italy
 John Paul II Institute at University of St. Thomas (Texas), U.S.

See also
 John Paul II Centre (disambiguation)
 John Paul II Foundation for Development and International Cooperation
 John Paul II Foundation for Research and Treatment, a hospital